School of Art, Game and Animation (SAGA) is a Brazilian school of computer graphics created in 2003 focused on digital art, computer graphics with courses for beginners, complete course in digital animation, 3D game development, market development model electronics and techniques of creating art for games. Formerly called "AIS".

History 
Founded in 2003, initially as a school computer courses, repositioned its line of action in 2008 (when it was renamed Saga), and became a school of art courses and digital animation. Saga operates in São Paulo, Salvador, Recife, Brasilia and Belo Horizonte. In March 2011 the school and the Gnomon School of Visual Effects, United States, marked the partnership, the result is the creation of an international school of digital art that will "bring together the best artists in the world to train professionals able to work with leading technologies CG, animation and visual effects used in Hollywood".

Courses 
 Start (computer graphics for beginners);
 Synapse (full course of digital animation);
 PlayGame (3D game development);
 Marquise (market mockup);
 WarpZone (rearing techniques of the art of games);

References

External links 
 SAGA website (in Portuguese)

Schools in Brazil
Educational institutions established in 2003
2003 establishments in Brazil